Ma vie en rose (English translation: My Life in Pink) is a 1997 Franco-Belgian drama film directed by Alain Berliner. It tells the story of Ludovic, a transgender girl, and depicts her family and community struggling to accept her gender identity.

The film received largely positive reviews and was selected as the Belgian entry for the Best Foreign Language Film at the 70th Academy Awards, but was not accepted as a nominee.

Plot
Pierre and Hanna Fabre move into their dream house with wonderful neighbors and an idyllic community. Their youngest child, Ludovic, identifies as a girl and wants to live as one, despite being assigned male.

One day, Ludovic befriends Jérôme, the son of Pierre's boss whose family lives across from the Fabres, and expresses a desire to marry him. When visiting Jérôme's house, Ludovic enters Jérôme's sister's bedroom and puts on one of her dresses, unaware that his parents were preserving the room after her death. Jérôme's mother finds Ludovic, and she and the rest of the neighbors are horrified.

The community turns against Ludovic and, by extension, the rest of the Fabre family. After Ludovic stands in as Snow White in a school play, the rest of the parents collectively sign a petition to have Ludovic expelled. Pierre, under strain as an employee of Jérôme's father, is unable to cope and causes conflict within the family. Ludovic is assaulted by the boys on the soccer team in the locker room after a match. Her brother Jean tries to stop it, but is held back.

Following a particularly bad argument, Ludovic attempts suicide by hiding in a freezer, but is found in time and allowed to wear a skirt to a neighborhood party. While the other neighbors greet Ludo warmly, Pierre is fired the next day and finds his house graffitied. Ludovic flees, distraught. Hanna blames Ludovic for all that has gone wrong. In order to set her child straight, she cuts Ludovic's hair short. Resentful of her mother, Ludovic goes to live with grandmother Élisabeth. When Ludovic and Élisabeth visit Pierre and Hanna one weekend, Pierre announces that he has a new job, but it is out of town and they have to move.

At their new house, Ludovic is befriended by Chris (born Christine) Delvigne, a masculine child. Chris' mother invites Ludovic to Chris' dress-up birthday party, which Ludo attends in a musketeer outfit. Chris, unhappy in a princess outfit, asks Ludo to swap and has the other young party guests force Ludo to do so upon refusal. When Ludovic's mother sees them, she fears that their troubles are beginning again and lashes out by hitting Ludo until the other party guests restrain her.

Hanna follows Ludovic to a billboard where she is shocked to see Ludo in the picture, running away with Pam, the Barbie-like protagonist. When she tries to follow her, she falls through the ground and awakens at home. She and Pierre assure Ludo that they will no longer try to control her gender expression. In turn, Ludo assures her mother that she never really intended to run away with Pam. Hanna, happy to see her, accepts Ludo's identity and says Ludo will always be her child.

Cast

Production
Although internationally presented as a Belgian film because of the nationality of Berliner, its director and co-screenwriter, the film is an international co-production between companies in Belgium, the United Kingdom and France – the majority of the production work was done by the French independent film house Haut et Court and the shooting took place south of Paris, France, near the commune of Évry.

The color timing in the film is significant: it changes as parents exit from the school play, switching to cold blue tones.

Release
In the United States, the film received an R rating by the Motion Picture Association of America, an unusual decision due to the film's minimal sexual content, minimal violence and mild language. Opposition believes that the rating was the result of transphobia.

Reception
Ma vie en rose received critical acclaim. On review aggregator website Rotten Tomatoes, it has a 92% approval score based on 25 reviews, with an average rating of 7.50/10. The consensus states: "Ma Vie en Rose follows a boy's exploration of his gender identity with warmth and empathy - for its young protagonist as well as the family affected by his journey."

Accolades
The film won the Golden Globe Award for Best Foreign Language Film. It also won the Crystal Globe award at the Karlovy Vary International Film Festival.

See also

References

External links

Sony Pictures Section on the film
Why is Ma Vie en Rose rated R?

1997 films
1997 comedy-drama films
1997 LGBT-related films
Belgian comedy-drama films
Belgian LGBT-related films
French comedy-drama films
French LGBT-related films
British comedy-drama films
British LGBT-related films
LGBT-related coming-of-age films
Crystal Globe winners
Films about dysfunctional families
Belgian independent films
Films about trans women
Heart of Sarajevo Award for Best Film winners
French independent films
British independent films
Best Foreign Language Film Golden Globe winners
LGBT-related comedy-drama films
1997 independent films
1990s French-language films
French-language Belgian films
Films directed by Alain Berliner
1990s British films
1990s French films